Nectomys grandis, also known as the Magdalena-Cauca water rat, is a nocturnal, semiaquatic species of rodent in the genus Nectomys of family Cricetidae. It is found in western and northern Colombia at altitudes from sea level to 2000 m, including the basins of the Magdalena, Cauca and Porce rivers. It has two subspecies, N. g. grandis and N. g. magdalenae.

References

Mammals of Colombia
Nectomys
Mammals described in 1897
Taxa named by Oldfield Thomas